Carmel Budiardjo (née Brickman; 18 June 1925 – 10 July 2021) was an English human rights activist, lecturer, and author. She was the founder of the non-governmental organisation Tapol. Budiardjo was known for campaigning for the awareness of war crimes and human rights abuses in Indonesia and East Timor. For her activism, she was awarded the Right Livelihood Award in 1995.

Early life
She came from a Jewish family in London, whose anti-fascist beliefs influenced her left-wing politics. She received a bachelor's degree in Economics in 1946 from the University of London, where she became active in the National Union of Students. While working in Prague for the International Union of Students, she met Suwondo 'Bud' Budiardjo, an Indonesian government official whom she married in 1950. The couple moved to Indonesia in 1951, and she became an Indonesian citizen in 1954.

Early career
Budiardjo worked first as a translator for Antara, the Indonesian news agency, then in economic research for the Ministry of Foreign Affairs, later studying at the University of Indonesia's School of Economics and then lecturing at Padjadjaran University in Bandung and Res Publica (now Trisakti) University in Jakarta.

Activism
After General Suharto seized power in 1966, her husband was imprisoned, spending 12 years in jail. She was herself arrested, and later imprisoned in 1968 for three years and, after her release in 1971, was deported to England.

Upon returning she founded Tapol to campaign for political prisoners in Indonesia, which took its name from the abbreviation of tahanan politik, or political prisoner in Indonesian. The organisation expanded its activities, and was prominent in getting out information on military activity and human rights violations in East Timor, invaded and occupied by Indonesia in 1975, as well as West Papua and Aceh. The Tapol Bulletin was a major source of information about the human rights situation in Indonesia under the New Order. She was also the author of a number of books on human rights and politics in Indonesia. The organisation remains active, with Budiardjo still playing a very important part in its activities until her death.

In 1995, Budiardjo was awarded the Right Livelihood Award for her work, being nominated by the International Federation for East Timor.

Death
Budiardjo died on 10 July 2021 in London at age 96.  On 6 August 2021 Budiardjo was featured in the BBC Radio 4 obituary programme Last Word.

Works 

 Budiardjo, Carmel and Liem Soei Liong. The War Against East Timor. London: Zed Books, 1984. .

 Budiardjo, Carmel. Surviving Indonesia's Gulag: A Western Woman Tells Her Story. London: Cassell, 1996. .

References

External links

 Tapol Homepage
 Right livelihood award: 1995 – Carmel Budiardjo
 "tapol Fights On"—1982 Article on Carmel

1925 births
2021 deaths
English Jews
Indonesian Jews
British human rights activists
Women human rights activists
Alumni of the University of London
British people imprisoned abroad
People from London
Prisoners and detainees of Indonesia
English emigrants to Indonesia
Naturalised citizens of Indonesia